The St. Agnes Church is a congregation of the Roman Catholic Church in Utica, South Dakota, operated as a mission of the parish of St. John the Baptist in Lesterville, both in the Diocese of Sioux Falls. It is noted for its historic Gothic Revival church, sometimes known as the Sigel Church after the former name of the area, which was built in the 1890s and added to the National Register of Historic Places in 1980.

The community was established in 1885 and as of 2010, had about 40 families.

References

External links

Churches on the National Register of Historic Places in South Dakota
Gothic Revival church buildings in South Dakota
Religious organizations established in 1885
Roman Catholic churches completed in 1892
Churches in Yankton County, South Dakota
Churches in the Roman Catholic Diocese of Sioux Falls
National Register of Historic Places in Yankton County, South Dakota